Jon Karrikaburu Jaimerena (born 19 September 2002) is a Spanish professional footballer who plays as a forward for CD Leganés, on loan from Real Sociedad.

Club career
Born in Elizondo, Navarre, Karrikaburu joined Real Sociedad's youth setup in 2014, aged 12. He made his senior debut with the C-team at the age of just 17 on 14 September 2019, starting and scoring his team's only in a 2–1 Tercera División away loss against Pasaia KE.

Karrikaburu scored ten goals for the C's during his first senior season, and netted an impressive rate of 22 goals in only 20 matches for the side in his second; highlights included two hat-tricks against CD Aurrerá Ondarroa (4–1 home win) and SD Balmaseda FC (4–2 away win) and four goals in a 6–1 thrashing of SD Deusto. On his debut for the reserves on 28 March 2021, he also scored the side's third in a 4–1 win over Deportivo Alavés B in the Segunda División B.

On 3 May 2021, Karrikaburu renewed his contract until 2026. He made an instant impact for the B-side after his debut, contributing with four goals in nine appearances as his side returned to the Segunda División after a 59-year absence; one of his goals was an extra time winner in a 2–1 defeat of Algeciras CF, which sealed Sanses promotion. 

Karrikaburu made his professional debut on 14 August 2021, starting and scoring the winner in a 1–0 home win over CD Leganés. He made his first team debut on 30 September, replacing fellow youth graduate Mikel Oyarzabal in a 1–1 home draw against AS Monaco FC, for the season's UEFA Europa League.

On 15 January 2023, Karrikaburu was loaned to second division side CD Leganés for the remainder of the season.

References

External links

2002 births
Living people
People from Baztán (comarca)
Spanish footballers
Footballers from Navarre
Association football forwards
La Liga players
Segunda División players
Segunda División B players
Tercera División players
Real Sociedad C footballers
Real Sociedad B footballers
Real Sociedad footballers
CD Leganés players
Spain under-21 international footballers